Ahobaa Festival is an annual festival celebrated by the chiefs and peoples of Enyan-Kakraba near Saltpond in the Central Region of Ghana. It is usually celebrated in the month of June.

Celebrations 
During the festival, visitors are welcomed to share food and drinks. The people put on traditional clothes and there is durbar of chiefs. There is also dancing and drumming.

Significance 
This festival is celebrated to obtain the benediction of their ancestors.

References 

Festivals in Ghana
Central Region (Ghana)